Fabio Dario Biancalani (born 22 September 1961) is an Argentine Justicialist Party politician. He sat in the Argentine Senate representing Chaco Province from 2007 to 2013.

Prior to entering politics, Biancalani ran his family's construction firm.

Biancalani was elected to the Senate on the Frente Chaco Merece Más party list, and is part of the majority Front for Victory caucus. Biancalani reaped criticism for the cost of road maintenance contract for Chaco's Route 7. The contract had been awarded to the Adelmo Biancalani firm.

References

Living people
1966 births
Members of the Argentine Senate for Chaco
People from Chaco Province
Argentine people of Italian descent
Justicialist Party politicians
Argentine businesspeople